XIII BIS Records is an independent record label based in Paris, France, that releases music in a variety of genres.

Artists
XIII BIS has issued releases by the following artists:
 Adagio
 Marc Almond
 Alain Chamfort
 Ray Charles
 Lloyd Cole
 Dagoba
 Elmer Food Beat
 Fiction Plane
 Michel Fugain
 Will Haven
 Heavenly
 Mick Hucknall
 Michael Jones
 La Caravane Passe
 Living Colour
 Loudblast
 Ziggy Marley
 Myrath
 Nine Inch Nails
 Paul Personne
 Prefab Sprout
 Patrick Rondat
 Rammstein
 Susheela Raman
 Calvin Russell
 Simply Red
 Skindred
 Skinlab
 Suede
 Tears For Fears
 The Gladiators
 The Hall Effect
 The Parlotones
 Tarja Turunen
 Vulcain
 Weepers Circus

See also
 List of record labels

References

External links
 

French independent record labels
IFPI members